I Am Frankie is an American drama television series based on a story created by Marcela Citterio that aired on Nickelodeon from September 4, 2017 to October 4, 2018. Based on Yo Soy Franky, the series focuses on Alex Hook in the titular role of Frankie Gaines, an android who is attempting to pass herself off as a normal teenage girl.

Series overview

Episodes

Pilot (2017)

Season 1 (2017)

Season 2 (2018)

Special (2017)

Notes

References 

Lists of American children's television series episodes
Lists of American drama television series episodes
Lists of Nickelodeon television series episodes